İris Rosenberger (born October 16, 1985, in Traunstein, West Germany) is a Turkish female swimmer competing in the butterfly events.
 is a member of Fenerbahçe Swimming in Istanbul. In Germany, she swims for the teams, SV Wacker Burghausen, Erster Münchner SC and SG Essen.

Her identical twin sister Yasemin is also a swimmer. The twins were born to German father Peter Rosenberger and Turkish mother Leyla Aktaş-Rosenberger, a painter, ceramic artist and sculptor, in Traunstein, Germany. They have a younger sister Deniz, who is also a swimmer. Iris studied business administration at the Ludwig Maximilian University of Munich.

Representing Turkey, Iris took part in the 100 m butterfly event at the 2008 Summer Olympics, where she swam 1:01.67 without advancing to the finals.

In 2009, Iris set new Turkish national records in 50 m butterfly with 27.00 and in 100 m butterfly with 59:45. She holds more than 19 national records for Turkey.

Achievements

See also
 Turkish women in sports

References

1985 births
Twin sportspeople
Identical twins
Living people
Female butterfly swimmers
Turkish female swimmers
Fenerbahçe swimmers
Olympic swimmers of Turkey
Swimmers at the 2008 Summer Olympics
German people of Turkish descent
Turkish people of German descent
Ludwig Maximilian University of Munich alumni